The 1972 Gent–Wevelgem was the 34th edition of the Gent–Wevelgem cycle race and was held on 12 April 1972. The race started in Ghent and finished in Wevelgem. The race was won by Roger Swerts of the Molteni team.

General classification

Notes

References

Gent–Wevelgem
April 1972 sports events in Europe
1972 in road cycling
1972 in Belgian sport